Niko Peraić (born 21 September 1988 in Polača) is a Croatian football defender, currently playing for NK Polača.

External links
 Niko Peraić at hrsport.net 

1988 births
Living people
People from Polača
Association football defenders
Croatian footballers
HNK Hajduk Split players
NK Junak Sinj players
NK Zadar players
Croatian Football League players